Greene is an unincorporated village and census-designated place in the western part of the town of Coventry, Rhode Island, United States. As of the 2010 census it had a population of 888. The name derives from Nathanael Greene, a Rhode Island-born general in the American Revolution.

History
Until 1854 Greene was a swamp with a cart path running through it. The path connected Hopkins Hollow to the south and Rice City to the north. In the early 1850s, the railroad came to the area. The original train stop was known as "Coffin Station" because Coffin Road was the nearest road. In 1856 railroad officials renamed the station "Greene" after the Revolutionary War hero. It was decided to build a depot where local farmers could sell their produce to the trains heading towards Providence and Hartford. Within a few years of opening, the Greene depot was the most important station in western Rhode Island. Every morning farmers would bring their produce to sell to the 7:25 milk train going to Providence.

As the station grew in importance, a village grew up around it, sending large amounts of milk, wood and cranberries via train. Eventually, a school, church, library, and meeting hall were built, as well as a religious campground in the Greene area, where the Advent Christian Church held annual camp meetings starting in 1880 on what was previously part of the Peckham estate. The religious campground was perhaps the most important one in Rhode Island, where every summer, camp meetings were held in the style more commonly found in the South and in the Mid-West. The railroad would add on extra cars to their trains, and up to 10,000 people would attend. After the beginning of the 20th century, the camp meeting declined and ended decades later.

With the coming of the automobile in the first part of the 20th century, the railroad's importance declined greatly, and in 1969, it closed. Today, Greene is a shadow of what it once was. However, the village is mostly intact, with most of the buildings dating from the late 19th century.

Geography
The Greene census-designated place includes the communities of Greene, Fairbanks Corner, Rice City and Summit. Rhode Island Route 14 runs along the northern edge of the CDP through Fairbanks Corner, and leads northeast  to Providence and west  to Moosup, Connecticut. Rhode Island Route 117 passes through the center of the CDP, from Fairbanks Corner through Greene village, and over to Summit, eventually leading  to Apponaug in the city of Warwick. Rhode Island Route 102 forms the eastern border of the CDP; it leads north  to Clayville in the town of Scituate and south the same distance to Interstate 95 in the town of West Greenwich.

The Coventry Greenway, part of the East Coast Greenway running from Maine to Florida, is a rail trail that runs through the community on the route of the old New York, New Haven and Hartford Railroad.

The community is drained by the Moosup River, which flows west to the Quinebaug River in Connecticut.

Demographics

References

Villages in Kent County, Rhode Island
Coventry, Rhode Island
Census-designated places in Kent County, Rhode Island
Providence metropolitan area
Villages in Rhode Island
Census-designated places in Rhode Island